Tang Tianbiao (born October 1940) is a general in the People's Liberation Army of China. He was a member of the 15th and 16th Central Committee of the Chinese Communist Party. He was a delegate to the 9th and 10th National People's Congress and a member of the Standing Committee of the 11th National People's Congress.

Biography
Tang was born in Shimen County, Hunan, in October 1940. He enlisted in the People's Liberation Army (PLA) in July 1960, and joined the Chinese Communist Party (CCP) in December 1961. In 1961, he entered Harbin Military Academy of Engineering (now National University of Defense Technology), majoring in the Engineering Department. After graduating in 1966, he was assigned to the Guangzhou Military Region, one of the PLA Military Regions. In May 1988, he was despatched to the People's Liberation Army General Political Department and appointed deputy head of Cadre Bureau. He moved up the ranks to become executive assistant in June 1993 and deputy head in 1995. He also served as deputy director the PLA Navy Political Department from for a short year in 1992. In December 2005, he took office as vice chairperson of the National People's Congress Agriculture and Rural Affairs Committee, a position he held until March 2008, when he was chosen as vice chairperson of the National People's Congress Education, Science, Culture and Public Health Committee.

He was promoted to the rank of major general (shaojiang) in 1988, lieutenant general (zhongjiang) in 1995, and general (shangjiang) in 2000.

References

1940 births
Living people
People from Shimen County
National University of Defense Technology alumni
Central Party School of the Chinese Communist Party alumni
People's Liberation Army generals from Hunan
People's Republic of China politicians from Hunan
Chinese Communist Party politicians from Hunan
Delegates to the 9th National People's Congress
Delegates to the 10th National People's Congress
Members of the Standing Committee of the 11th National People's Congress
Members of the 15th Central Committee of the Chinese Communist Party
Members of the 16th Central Committee of the Chinese Communist Party